Megachile rotundipennis is a species of bee in the family Megachilidae. It was described by W. F. Kirby in 1900.

References

Rotundipennis
Insects described in 1900